MMQ or mmq may refer to:

 Methylmethaqualone, a chemical compound
 MMQ, the IATA code for Mbala Airport, Zambia
 mmq, the ISO 639-3 code for Aisi language, Papua New Guinea